Eréndira is a 1983 drama film directed by Ruy Guerra. The film script was written by Gabriel García Márquez. The original script actually preceded his novella The Incredible and Sad Tale of Innocent Eréndira and Her Heartless Grandmother published in 1972. The characters of Eréndira and her grandmother had already appeared briefly in his book One Hundred Years of Solitude (1967). Garcia Marquez' recreated the screenplay from memory (the original was lost) for Guerra's film. Guerra incorporated elements from another Garcia Marquez story ("Death Constant Beyond Love") to meet his narrative needs in the subplot of Senator Onésimo Sanchez.

The film was an international coproduction involving Mexico, France and West Germany. It was shot in Spanish on locations in San Luis Potosi, Veracruz, Zacatecas and in studios in Mexico. It was entered into the 1983 Cannes Film Festival and was selected as the Mexican entry for the Best Foreign Language Film at the 56th Academy Awards, but was not accepted as a nominee.

Plot
Eréndira, a teenaged girl, lives with her eccentric grandmother in a vast, gloomy house in a windswept desert region. Exploited by her grandmother, Eréndira must work all day long doing house chores, until she sleepwalks due to exhaustion. The heartless grandmother lives in her own world, talking to herself and crying uncontrollably over sentimental French songs. One day Eréndira is so tired from all the work that she falls sleep without extinguishing the candles. The curtains catch fire accidentally, burning the house down to the foundation walls.

Having calculated the debt Eréndira owes her for the destruction of her home and belongings, the grandmother decides the only way the girl will be able to repay such a vast amount is by prostituting herself. Eréndira submits to her fate without protest and the grandmother does not waste any time trading Eréndira's virginity to a local merchant for 250 pesos and three days' provisions for their trip. When Eréndira resists, the man slaps and rapes her.

Eréndira and her grandmother subsequently travel through the desert while the young girl sells her body to countless men – peasants, Indians, humble workers, soldiers and the smugglers that populate the region. The grandmother collects the money, makes all the decisions, and pays the Indian servants. As the business prospers it achieves carnivalesque proportions: the two women are joined by hangers-on, vendors, musicians, and a mysterious photographer.

One day, having had sex with an army of soldiers, Eréndira falls sick and the line of men waiting outside her tent is dismissed. Then, Ulises, the young son of a smuggler traveling through the region, sneaks into the tent after the old woman has gone to sleep. Eréndira finds him charming; she charges him for her services and teaches him how to make love. By the next morning Ulises has fallen in love with her.

En route from one town to the next, a group of monks take Eréndira away from the grip of her grandmother, sending her to their mission in the desert until she marries. Undaunted, the grandmother hires a Mexican peasant boy to marry Eréndira and thus gets her granddaughter back in the same old rut. To undermine any further attempts by the priests to confiscate her money-making resource, the grandmother must obtain a letter from someone important testifying to her granddaughter's high moral character. The grandmother sends Eréndira to Senator Onésimo Sanchez, a man dying of some mysterious disease. The crafty woman locks a chastity belt on Eréndira, which the Senator discovers cannot be unlocked until he writes the letter.

The grandmother's business suffers a second setback when Ulises reappears and persuades Eréndira to run off with him. His plan is to live off a fortune from oranges which contain diamonds smuggled by his Dutch father. The young couple heads for the border in a truck the boy has stolen from his father. Finally caught, Eréndira watches from the halted truck as her lover suffers a whipping from his father. The grandmother, preventing a new escape attempt, chains her granddaughter to the bed. However, angry prostitutes, bereft of business because Eréndira is in town, march to their competitor's tent and haul the young woman out of it over the old woman's curses.

By now the Grandmother is quite wealthy. She and Eréndira live in a large tent beside the sea, furnished even more grandly than the lost desert home. The old woman plays her piano, bathes, and gives orders to her now hardened charge. Realizing that only her grandmother's death would free her, Eréndira pushes Ulises to kill the old woman. Ulises first two attempts on her life by poisoning and an explosive are unsuccessful. Finally, goaded by Eréndira, he picks up a kitchen knife and stabs the old woman in the back. With his grandmother's death, Eréndira's palm suddenly acquires lines. She picks up her grandmother's vest of gold and runs off into the desert, leaving Ulises behind in tears. "No voice on earth could stop me," Eréndira tells us in a voice over as she disappears into the desert. "And no trace of my misfortune was ever found."

Cast
 Irene Papas as the grandmother
 Cláudia Ohana as Eréndira
 Michael Lonsdale as Senator Onésimo Sanchez
 Oliver Wehe as Ulysses
 Rufus as the photographer
 Blanca Guerra as Ulysses' mother
 Ernesto Gómez Cruz as the grocer
 Pierre Vaneck as Ulysses' father
 Carlos Cardán as Smuggler
 Humberto Elizondo as Blacaman
 Jorge Fegán as the commander
 Francisco Mauri as the postman
 Sergio Calderón as the truck driver
 Martín Palomares as escort
 Salvador Garcini as puppet-player

See also
 List of submissions to the 56th Academy Awards for Best Foreign Language Film
 List of Mexican submissions for the Academy Award for Best Foreign Language Film

References

Bibliography
 García Saucedo, Jaime. Diccionario de literatura colombina en el cine. panamericna Editorial. 2003. ISBN 958301025  -1

External links

1983 films
1983 drama films
1980s Spanish-language films
Mexican drama films
Films directed by Ruy Guerra
Films about prostitution in Mexico
Films based on works by Gabriel García Márquez
Miramax films
1980s Mexican films